The Devil's Punchbowl was a refugee camp created in Natchez, Mississippi during the American Civil War to house freed slaves.

Description 
In order to house the large numbers of African Americans, the Union Army created a walled encampment at a location known as the Devil's Punchbowl, a natural pit surrounded by bluffs. Some ex-slaves died of starvation, smallpox, and other diseases. Over 20,000 innocent formerly enslaved people died here in one year. Some scholars have suggested that the stories have been embellished or fabricated by Confederate apologists intent on blaming the Union Army for atrocities.

References

American Civil War prison camps
Buildings and structures in Natchez, Mississippi
American freedmen
Military operations of the American Civil War in Mississippi